Clitae may refer to:
Clitae (Bithynia), a town in the north of ancient Anatolia
Clitae (Macedonia), a town of ancient Macedonia, Greece
Clitae (tribe), a tribe of ancient Cilicia, in the south of ancient Anatolia